Brant Point Light is a lighthouse located on Nantucket Island. The station was established in 1746, automated in 1965, and is still in operation. The current tower was added to the National Register of Historic Places on October 28, 1987; it has the distinction of being the tenth light on the point, in addition to several range lights. Four of the others burned or blew down, two were condemned, two were unsatisfactory, and the remaining one stands unused.

Chronology
1746: First wood tower, burned 1758
1759: Second wood tower, blown down March 9, 1774
1774: Third wood tower, burned 1783
1783: Lantern between two spars
1786: Fifth light, a frame with a place for lights at the top, wrecked 1788
1788-95: (date not certain) Sixth light, a tower, condemned 1825
1825: Tower framework on top of keeper's dwelling, rotten by 1853
1856: Brick tower, still standing, front light of Nantucket Range Lights
1901: Wood tower, the tenth light and seventh tower replaced the 1900 lantern, still in use

History
At a town meeting at Nantucket on January 24, 1746, the sea captains of the island spoke out for a lighthouse and the sum of 200 pounds was voted "in supposition that the owners of or others concerned in, shipping will maintain a light therein", but the town actually paid for its maintenance. The wood 1746 tower burned in 1758.

Town meeting authorized a new light, which was completed in 1759, which lasted until 1774. From the March 12, 1774, issue of The Massachusetts Gazette and the Boston PostBoy and Advertiser, "We hear from Nantucket that on Wednesday the 9th of March Instant (1774) at about 8 o’clock in the Morning, they had a most violent Gust of Wind that perhaps was ever known there, but it lasted only about a Minute. It seemed to come in a narrow Vein, and in its progress blew down. and totally destroyed the Light-House on that Island, besides several Shops, Barns, etc. Had the Gust continued fifteen Minutes it is thought it would not have left more than half the Buildings standing, in the Course that it passed. But we don’t hear of any Persons receiving much hurt, nor much Damage done, except the loss of the Light-House which in every respect is considerable."

Town meeting promptly agreed to rebuild the lighthouse for the third time "as High as the former one that blew down lately at the Town’s Expense." The town petitioned the General Court of Massachusetts (the Legislature, not a court) for permission to levy tonnage dues, and, beginning August 1, 1774, it was ordered that any vessel over 15 tons was subject to a charge of 6 shillings the first time each year it entered or left Nantucket Harbor. In 1783, the lighthouse burned.

The first three lighthouses had been built with more of eye to economy than quality, but the fourth had no quality at all. It was simply a wood lantern with glass windows hoisted between two spars. This lamp was very dim and was often compared by mariners to a lightning bug; hence it received the name "bug light" and was replaced in 1786 by a slightly more elaborate structure, a frame, fitted at the top for lamps. This was wrecked in a heavy storm in 1788.

In August 1789 Congress voted to transfer the colonial lights to the Federal Government. Between then and 1795, another tower was erected on Brant Point. According to a "Memoranda of Cessions by Massachusetts," dated 1795, "The lighthouse on Brant Point with the tenements and land thereto belonging, owned by the State, was ceded to the United States in 1795."

This building, the sixth to be erected on this site, was also cheaply built and was condemned in 1825.  A small tower framework, the seventh light, was built on top of the keeper's dwelling in 1825. This had eight lamps arranged in a double row, six in the lower series and two in the upper tier.  Behind each of these lamps were 12’ 2-inch reflectors.

On November 9, 1853, C. A. Ogden, Major, Topographical Engineers, recommended to the Lighthouse Board that they build a tower for a second-class lens light which would cost $15,000. "The frame of the light tower at Brant Point is so completely rotted as to require reconstruction with the least possible delay," the letter continued, "and believing it to be the wise policy of the Board to make all its future construction permanent, I have asked the above amount for the tower. The dwelling house is much decayed, but has a nearly new roof and weather boarding on it, and may last for some years yet." A similar recommendation to the Board dated October 22, 1853, from Even W. Allen, Collector and Superintendent, District of Nantucket, reads in part "The whole establishment at Brant Point is very much out of repair, and from the age, material, and construction of the building, I should not consider it good economy to repair it; the interests of the Government and all concerned, seem to demand a more permanent and commodious structure." On August 3, 1854, Congress appropriated $15,000 "for rebuilding the lighthouse at Brandt’s Point, Nantucket, State of Massachusetts." The tower was described: "The foundation of the tower is of concrete cement two feet thick, and 18 feet in diameter. The base is of hammered granite, laid in courses two feet thick to the height of 12 feet. The interior of the base forms a cistern, where water may be caught for household purposes. The column forming the tower is of brick laid in cement, with an airspace within the walls for ventilation. The lamp is of cast iron, with 12 lights of plate glass. A circular iron stairway winds its spiral way up to a floor of iron, where rests the lantern, 58 feet above the foundation and 47 feet above the ground."

The fourth order Fresnel lens was first lit on December 10, 1856. The tower is still in place, with its lantern gone, on the grounds of the Coast Guard base. During its active period, it was the front light of a range formed with the Nantucket Beacon; this range was replaced by the Nantucket Harbor Range Lights.

In 1900 a fixed red light was installed at the extremity of Brant Point, 600 ft (200m) from the 1856 tower, it having been found necessary to move the light outward, owing to changes in the channel. This was the ninth light to be located on the Brant Point site in addition to the Nantucket Harbor Range Lights.

In 1901 a new tower, the tenth light and seventh tower, was built at the extremity of the point, and the light exhibited there for the first time on January 31, 1901. There was originally a fog bell at the station. That tower, now fitted with a fog horn, is still in use.

In 1887 a dispute surfaced over the boundaries of the lighthouse site. This was settled in 1901 when five lots, totaling , containing three summer houses and part of a hotel, were sold by the Federal government as no longer needed for lighthouse purposes.

Mystic Seaport Light was built in 1966 as a replica of the 1901 Brant Point Light.

Gallery

See also 
List of Registered Historic Places in Nantucket County, Massachusetts

References

External links 

Inventory of Historic Light Stations

Lighthouses completed in 1746
Towers completed in 1746
Lighthouses completed in 1759
Towers completed in 1759
Lighthouses completed in 1774
Towers completed in 1774
Lighthouses completed in 1786
Towers completed in 1786
Lighthouses completed in 1785
Towers completed in 1785
Lighthouses completed in 1856
Lighthouses completed in 1901
Lighthouses on the National Register of Historic Places in Massachusetts
National Register of Historic Places in Nantucket, Massachusetts
Lighthouses in Nantucket, Massachusetts